The stirred dough, known as jiaotuan in Chinese, also translated as stirred paste, sticky corn-flour jelly, is a snack from Northwest China, defined as a kind of "paste made of flour".

The origin of the stirred dough cannot be verified, although its inventions has been traditionally attributed to Zhuge Liang from the Three Kingdoms Period. At that time, the name was not yet called "stirred dough", but was figuratively called "water surrounding the city".

References

Shaanxi cuisine
Snack foods
Chinese cuisine